Caroline Dolehide was the defending champion, having won the previous edition in 2019. She lost in the second round to Katrina Scott.

Magdalena Fręch won the title, defeating Renata Zarazúa in the final, 6–3, 7–6(7–4).

Seeds

Draw

Finals

Top half

Bottom half

Qualifying

Seeds

Qualifiers

Lucky loser

Qualifying draw

First qualifier

Second qualifier

Third qualifier

Fourth qualifier

References

External Links
Main Draw
Qualifying Draw

Thoreau Tennis Open - Singles